Since the Day It All Came Down is the second full-length studio album by the Finnish melodic death metal band Insomnium, released on 5 April 2004 via Candlelight Records.

Track listing

Credits

Insomnium
 Niilo Sevänen − vocals, bass guitar
 Ville Friman − guitar
 Ville Vänni − guitar
 Markus Hirvonen − drums

Additional musicians
 All arrangements by Insomnium
 Keyboards by Jone Väänänen except tracks 6 and 11 by Aleksi Munter
 Cellos by Laura Naire

Production and artwork
 Recorded and mixed at Mediaworks Studios, Joensuu, between July and September 2003 by Jone Väänänen, assisted by Timo Pekkarinen
 Mastered at Finnvox by Mika Jussila
 Band photos by Sakari Lindell
 Booklet design and layout by Jarno Lahti at Kaamos

References

External links
 www.insomnium.net

Insomnium albums
2004 albums